Lisa Wells may refer to:

 Lisa Wells (astronomer)
 Lisa Wells (musician), member of the American band The Honeymoon Killers
 Lisa Wells (writer), American poet and essayist

See also
 Alisa Wells